King-Lincoln Bronzeville is a historically African American neighborhood in Columbus, Ohio. Originally known as Bronzeville by the residents of the community, it was renamed the King-Lincoln District by Mayor Michael B. Coleman's administration to highlight the historical significance of the district's King Arts Complex and Lincoln Theatre, amid collaborations with investors and developers to revitalize the neighborhood.

In 2009, the King-Lincoln Bronzeville Neighborhood Association asked that the neighborhood be renamed to Bronzeville to reflect its history.

History

The origins of the neighborhood date back to the 19th century when freed and escaped slaves from across the Confederate South began to settle in Columbus. Originally settled more southward by the Scioto River, many Black families moved eastward in search of employment in domestic service work and industrial factories. Over the course of the next century, the community expanded to the boundaries of the current day district. The Black population grew as a result of the Great Migration after World War I, restrictive housing covenants in other areas, and White flight, leading Bronzeville to become the most populated African American neighborhood of the city.

By the 1930s, the neighborhood had become a self-sustaining community centered on Black businesses, services, and life. Bronzeville developed into an active entertainment district with four theaters (Lincoln, Empress, Cameo, and Pythian), and multiple jazz establishments. As the community developed, it grew to provide its own hospitals, schools, churches, and commercial establishments. The district would later serve as a congregational site for many civil rights activists in the 1950s and 1960s, including Martin Luther King Jr.

Having remained a self-sustained community for nearly half a century, Bronzeville started to decline in 1962 with the construction of I-71. The highway segmented the district and now serves as the westernmost boundary of the district. Additionally, the lifting of many housing covenants and restrictions encouraged many middle and upper class Black families to leave the district and move to the suburbs of Columbus. Many business owners left the district and it quickly developed into a neighborhood ridden by unemployment, poverty, and crime.

In partnership with community organizations and associations, the City of Columbus initiated the King-Lincoln District Plan in 2001, a comprehensive revitalization plan aimed at improving the economic well-being and quality of life in the district. The plan was responsible for the renovation of the King Arts Complex (formerly Pythian Theatre), the Long Street bridge, and businesses in the district. The neighborhood has become a focus of the city's revitalization efforts which include renovation of the historic Lincoln Theatre and construction of new condominiums and expansion of retail space along Mt. Vernon Avenue and Long Street, which hosts the annual Long Street Tour cycling event.

Associations 
The district's prosperity was largely due to many community organizations and associations that helped support businesses, education, and civic life. Organizations such as the Long Street Business Association, Bronzeville Neighborhood Association, and The Near East Side, have been the main supporters for the preservation and revitalization of the historic district.

Geography
The King-Lincoln neighborhood is bound by Broad Street to the South, Taylor Avenue to the East, Atcheson Street to the North, and I-71 to the West. Originally a much larger area, the district has continually been redefined with new boundaries in response to the development of the city of Columbus. It is considered to be a neighborhood within the Near East side and is surrounded by downtown Columbus, Old Towne East, and the Mount Vernon and Woodland Park neighborhoods.

Structures and landmarks

Lincoln Theatre 

The Lincoln Theatre, originally named "The Ogden Theatre", is a 582-seat performing arts venue located at 769 E. Long Street. First developed by local entrepreneur Al Jackson and designed in the Egyptian Revival style by architect Carl Anderson, The Lincoln Theatre opened on November 26, 1928. It was soon a nexus of excitement, entertainment and community life in the predominantly African-American neighborhood. The Ogden was renamed the Lincoln Theatre in 1939 and continued to operate as a movie theatre and a nationally recognized hotspot for jazz.

Long Street Bridge and Cultural Wall 

The Long Street Bridge is located right above 1-71 and serves as a pedestrian link between the Discovery District and King-Lincoln District. It contains a 240 ft cultural wall, designed by local artists Kojo Kamau and Larry Winston Collins. The mural is made up of 60 panels displaying 139 images connected to the lively history of the King-Lincoln District. The bridge is one of the final pieces to the Ohio Department of Transportation's rebuild of the I-71/670 interchange Downtown.

Second Baptist Church 

The Second Baptist Church was founded in 1824 and is the first black Baptist church in Columbus, Ohio. The church building was built from 1907 to 1908. Pastor James Preston Poindexter, Second Baptist Church's pastor in 1858, is historically known for his involvement in the underground railroad as an enthusiastic abolitionist. Through his civil rights activism, he helped shaped the neighborhoods of King-Lincoln Bronzeville.

The King Art Complex 

The King Arts Complex opened in March 1987 and officially was completed in 1989. The King Arts Complex offers performing, cultural and educational programs that provide high artistic merit, varied and diverse experiences, and which increase and disseminate knowledge regarding the vast and significant contributions of African-Americans to the culture and history of America and the world. The King Arts Complex serves as a major anchor for development in the King-Lincoln District. It is also an oasis for cultural and educational activities as well.

East Broad Street Presbyterian Church

On September 20, 1887, The Presbytery officially established the Broad Street Presbyterian Church, and selected Rev. Marsten as the first pastor. Many criticized the move saying it was too far away from downtown, and was later considered “a smart strategic move” because of the growing experienced in the near east side.

Dining and entertainment

Mayme Moore Park 

Mayme Moore Park has a total of 2.30 acres. The park location is at 240 Martin Luther King Jr. Blvd Columbus, OH 43203 and adjacent to The King Arts Complex. Mayme Moore Park is the most popular park in the Bronzeville King-Lincoln District. It is a neighborhood park and an area for community gatherings, activities and celebrations. Mayme Moore Park hosts various community events such as the Free Jazz Series hosted by The King Arts Complex. Every Thursday in the summer, the Free Jazz Series is open free to the community to enjoy jazz musician performances and to participate in various family friendly activities.

Lincoln Cafe 
Lincoln Cafe, formally known as Zanzibar Brews was established in 2007 and is located at 740 E. Long Street, Columbus, OH 43203. The cafe's name was changed to fit the Lincoln District theme. Lincoln cafe is a progressive coffeehouse and spirit bar that has a variety food from soups to sandwiches. Wednesday through the weekend, Lincoln Cafe provides live entertainment such as Jazz and open mic poetry. The name "Zanzibar" comes from the East African Nation of Tanzia. The Lincoln cafe java is known for its island spices of cloves, nutmeg, cinnamon and pepper.

The Creole Kitchen 
The Creole Kitchen was established in 2006 by Chef Henry Butcher, a well known chef in Columbus and a native of Louisiana Bayou country. The Creole Kitchen is a take-out stop that serves authentic Creole cuisines such as crawfish etoufee, seafood jambalaya, fried gator, tasso gumbo, catfish Creole, red beans and rice. The restaurant location is at 1052 Mt. Vernon Plaza, Columbus, OH 43203.

The Cana Bar 
Cana Bar is a family owned bar and has been providing spirits, food and live entertainment since 1962. Every Friday, Saturday and Sunday, Cana Bar has live bands play and also at 8pm they serve fish, chicken and fries from Hick's Catering Service. The location is 859 East Long Street, Columbus, OH 43203.

Gallery

See also
 Plaza Hotel (Columbus, Ohio)

References

External links

 Rediscovering the Lost City of Bronzeville

African-American history of Ohio
Neighborhoods in Columbus, Ohio
Culture of Columbus, Ohio